Palms is the first studio album by the rock band Palms. It was released in 2013 in CD digipack, limited edition vinyl, limited edition cassette and digital download formats by Ipecac Records. The album was made available for streaming by Spin on June 18, 2013, one week before its release. Upon its release, Palms debuted at No. 55 on the Billboard 200 and received positive reviews. The album has been described as post-metal and alternative rock, much like singer Chino Moreno's main band, Deftones.

Track listing

Personnel
Palms album personnel adapted from AllMusic.

Band members
Chino Moreno – vocals
Jeff Caxide – bass
Aaron Harris – drums, engineering, mixing
Bryant Clifford Meyer – guitar, keyboards, engineering

Additional personnel
Chuck Anderson – artwork, design
Chris Common – digital mastering
James Plotkin – vinyl mastering
Travis Shinn – photography

References

2013 debut albums
Ipecac Recordings albums
Palms (band) albums